Odorrana geminata is a frog in the genus Odorrana. It is found in Vietnam.

Distribution 
Odorrana geminata is found in swamps and freshwater wetlands in Vietnam.

References 

Amphibians of Vietnam
Amphibians described in 2009
geminata